The Citadel Bulldogs basketball teams represented The Citadel, The Military College of South Carolina in Charleston, South Carolina, United States.  The program was established in 1900–01, and has continuously fielded a team since 1912–13.  Their primary rivals are College of Charleston, Furman and VMI.

1919–20

1920–21

1921–22

1922–23

1923–24

1924–25

With season sweeps of Clemson, Furman, and Wofford, a win in their only matchup with Presbyterian and a season split with South Carolina, the Bulldogs claim a South Carolina "state championship" for the 1924–25 season.

|-
|colspan=5 align=center|1925 SIAA tournament

1925–26

|-
|colspan=5 align=center|1926 SIAA tournament

1926–27

1927–28

|-
|colspan=5 align=center|1928 SIAA tournament

1928–29

References
 

The Citadel Bulldogs basketball seasons